Grégory Doucet (born 22 August 1973) is a French politician serving as Mayor of Lyon since 2020. He is a member of Europe Ecology – The Greens (EELV).

Mayor of Lyon
On 12 September 2019, Doucet was chosen to lead the EELV list in the 2020 municipal election, in which it received an absolute majority of the vote with 52.4% in the second round. It placed first in seven out of nine arrondissements in the second round; Doucet stood as a candidate in the 3rd arrondissement.

Elected to the mayorship by the municipal council of Lyon on 4 July 2020, he became the first member of his party to assume the office. He is also a councillor of Lyon Metropolis, where he sits on the Committee on Finance, Institutions, Resources and Territorial Organisation.

References

1973 births
Living people
Mayors of Lyon
Europe Ecology – The Greens politicians
Politicians from Auvergne-Rhône-Alpes
Politicians from Paris